Maudy Mikha Maria Tambayong, known as Mikha Tambayong (born in Jakarta, Indonesia, September 15, 1994) is an Indonesian singer, actress, model, and musician.

Cinematography

Film

soap opera

Discography

Advertisement 
 Pucelle (with Cinta Laura)
 Kino Snack It Cookies
 Dewan Nasional Perubahan Iklim (film by Senandung Bumi)
 Marina UV White
 Cadbury ad
 Laurier Double Comfort

References

External links 
 Profil dan Perjalanan Hidup Mikha Tambayong

1994 births
Living people
Minahasa people
Indonesian Christians
21st-century Indonesian women singers
Indonesian pop singers
Moluccan people
Indonesian rhythm and blues singers
Indonesian Roman Catholics
Indonesian dance musicians
Pelita Harapan University alumni